Jean-Pierre Munch (12 June 1926 – 17 October 1996) was a French road bicycle racer from Strasbourg who won the Paris–Nice in 1953.

External links

1926 births
1996 deaths
French male cyclists
Sportspeople from Strasbourg
Cyclists from Grand Est